Raymond Gushue,  (June 20, 1900 – December 18, 1980) was a Canadian lawyer and academic administrator. He was the President and Vice-Chancellor of the Memorial University of Newfoundland from 1952 to 1966.

Born in Whitbourne, Newfoundland, he received a law degree from Dalhousie University in 1925. He practised law until he was appointed chairman of the Newfoundland Fisheries Board in 1936. From 1947 to 1958, he was chairman of the Newfoundland Woods Labour Board.

In 1967, he was made an Officer of the Order of Canada "for his contributions in the fields of education and public service".

References

Canadian university and college chief executives
Memorial University of Newfoundland
Officers of the Order of Canada
1900 births
1980 deaths
People from Whitbourne, Newfoundland and Labrador
Dalhousie University alumni
Canadian Commanders of the Order of the British Empire
Canadian King's Counsel